Shiadeh-e Bala (also Romanized as Shīādeh-e Bālā; also known as Shīādeh-e Bālā Maḩalleh) is a village in Khvosh Rud Rural District, Bandpey-ye Gharbi District, Babol County, Mazandaran Province, Iran. At the 2006 census, its population was 151, in 41 families.

References 

Populated places in Babol County